Technetium(VII) oxide is the chemical compound with the formula Tc2O7.  This yellow volatile solid is a rare example of a molecular binary metal oxide, the other examples being RuO4, OsO4, and the unstable Mn2O7.  It adopts a centrosymmetric corner-shared bi-tetrahedral structure in which the terminal and bridging  Tc−O bonds are 167pm and 184 pm respectively and the Tc−O−Tc angle is 180°.

Technetium(VII) oxide is prepared by the oxidation of technetium at 450–500 °C:
4 Tc  +  7 O2  →  2 Tc2O7
It is the anhydride of pertechnetic acid and the precursor to sodium pertechnetate:
Tc2O7 + 2 H2O → 2 HTcO4
Tc2O7  +  2 NaOH  →  2 NaTcO4  +  H2O

References

Technetium compounds
Transition metal oxides
Acidic oxides